The following is a list of episodes from the TV series Pickle and Peanut.

Series overview
{|class="wikitable plainrowheaders" style="text-align center;"
|-
! colspan="2" rowspan="2"| Season
! rowspan="2"| Episodes
! colspan="2"| Original air date
|-
!First aired
!Last aired
|-
| style="background:#660099;"|
| 
| 
| 
| 
|-
| style="background:#7BA414;"|
| 
| 
| 
| 
|-
|}

Episodes

Season 1 (2015–16)

Season 2 (2017–18)

References

Pickle and Peanut